Spin the Bottle: An All-Star Tribute to KISS is a 2004 tribute album, featuring a variety of artists covering songs by the American rock band Kiss.

Album cover model: Kira Eggers

Track listing

References

Kiss (band) tribute albums
2004 compilation albums
Hard rock compilation albums
Heavy metal compilation albums